is a railway station on the Hankyu Kyoto Line and is in Hankyu Shojaku, Settsu, Osaka. It serves students of the nearby Osaka Gakuin University. Only local trains stop at the station.

The station adjoins a yard and a workshop of Hankyu Railway.

Layout
The station has 2 island platforms serving 2 tracks each, and one track connecting to Shojaku Depot and Workshop, located in the north of Line 2 served by the eastbound platform.

Local trains for Umeda and Tengachaya arrive at Line 5 during the non-rush hour to let limited express trains and semi-express trains pass Line 4.

References 
The station opened on 16 January 1928.

Station numbering was introduced to all Hankyu stations on 21 December 2013 with this station being designated as station number HK-66.

Stations next to Shōjaku

References

External links
 Shojaku Station from Hankyu Railway website

Railway stations in Japan opened in 1928
Railway stations in Osaka Prefecture
Settsu, Osaka
Hankyu Kyoto Main Line